Santa Fe Preparatory School is a private school located in Santa Fe, New Mexico The school provides grades 7-12 with an enrollment of 340 students. It was founded in February 1961.

History
The school was founded in February 1961. The school opened its doors 1963 at a campus on Canyon Road, with sixty-three students in seventh through ninth grades.

Campus 
In the early 1970s, Santa Fe Prep moved to its current site, a  campus near the Sangre de Cristo Mountains, adjacent to the Santa Fe campus of St. John's College. In 2001, Prep built a new School Commons and in 2006, the school completed a LEED Gold-certified library building that houses approximately 11,000 volumes.

The campus is also the location of the Meem Art Building, which was originally the home of architect John Gaw Meem.

Notable alumni

 Anna Gunn (class of 1986; actress)
 Tom Ford (class of 1979; fashion designer)
 Brad Sherwood (class of 1982; comedian)
 Miguel Sandoval (class of 1969; actor)
 Raul Midón (class of 1984; singer-songwriter)
 Peter Sarkisian (class of 1984; video and multimedia artist)

References

Independent Schools Association of the Southwest
Private high schools in New Mexico
Leadership in Energy and Environmental Design gold certified buildings
Educational institutions established in 1961
Schools in Santa Fe County, New Mexico
Buildings and structures in Santa Fe, New Mexico
1961 establishments in New Mexico
Preparatory schools in New Mexico